The 2008–09 season was Chelsea Football Club's 95th competitive season, 17th consecutive season in the Premier League and 103rd year in existence as a football club.

Kits
Supplier: Adidas / Sponsor: Samsung

Season summary
After again finishing second to Manchester United in the Premier League the previous season, Chelsea sacked their manager Avram Grant, replacing him with the Brazilian Luiz Felipe Scolari, who had managed the Portugal national team at UEFA Euro 2008 that lost in the quarter finals to Germany. The first few months of his management went according to plan, as Scolari's narrow 4–1–4–1 formation, using Ashley Cole and new arrival José Bosingwa as wing-backs, initially took the league by storm, leaving Chelsea top ahead of Liverpool after 13 games.

By the end of November, however, Scolari's Chelsea began to lose their form due to exhaustion. They suffered a 3–1 defeat away to Roma in the Champions League and being eliminated from the League Cup at Stamford Bridge by Championship side Burnley on penalties. In the league, they had a 0–0 draw at home to Newcastle United, (who were later to be relegated). Chelsea lost a home league game for the first time since 2004 (and 86 matches) when they lost to Liverpool, and a second home league defeat to rivals Arsenal dropped Chelsea to second place.

Chelsea qualified for the knock-out stages of the Champions League with a 2–1 victory against Romanian champions CFR Cluj at Stamford Bridge in the final match of the group. During the winter months, they drew against West Ham United, Fulham, Hull City and League One's Southend United in the FA Cup. Chelsea suffered defeats away to Manchester United and Liverpool, which left them in fourth place during February which would mean a Champions League place would not be certain. Long-term injuries to Michael Essien and Joe Cole marked the period while Didier Drogba was not included frequently.

Chelsea sacked Scolari, replacing him with Russia national team manager Guus Hiddink for the remainder of the season. Hiddink's regenerative effect was immediate, with four-straight league wins, including a vital 1–0 victory away to Aston Villa in his first game in charge, moving Chelsea into the top three. Eleven wins in the team's last 13 league games, marked by a 4–1 victory over Arsenal away at the Emirates Stadium, finally secured third place in the league, and Champions League football for a seventh consecutive season.

Although Chelsea's title challenge was already realistically over when he arrived, Hiddink led Chelsea to their fifth Champions League semi-final, knocking out Juventus and Liverpool before they were eliminated by Barcelona on away goals in the semi-final, with the performance of second leg referee Tom Henning Øvrebø proving particularly controversial. Despite the Champions League exit, the season culminated in a trip to Wembley Stadium, with Chelsea's final game of 2008–09 contested against Everton in the 2009 FA Cup Final. Chelsea won 2–1, winning the FA Cup for the fifth time in their history.

Key dates
24.05.08 – Avram Grant is sacked as Chelsea manager.
29.05.08 – Chelsea terminate assistant manager Henk ten Cate's contract.
11.06.08 – Chelsea name Luiz Felipe Scolari as new manager, with his contract officially starting on 1 July 2008.
03.08.08 – Chelsea thrash Milan 5–0 to take third place in the preseason Russian Railways Cup.
17.08.08 – Chelsea start their 2008–09 Premier League campaign with an emphatic 4–0 home victory over Portsmouth.
15.09.08 – Assistant manager Steve Clarke leaves Chelsea to become number two under Gianfranco Zola at West Ham United.
16.09.08 – Chelsea defeat Bordeaux 4–0 at Stamford Bridge in the opening match of the UEFA Champions League.
18.09.08 – Ray Wilkins is appointed assistant manager of Chelsea, in place of the departed Steve Clarke.
21.09.08 – Exactly four months after the 2008 Champions League final, Chelsea draw 1–1 at home against Manchester United in the Premier League.
24.09.08 – For the third time in a row, Chelsea start a competition with a 4–0 win, beating Portsmouth 4–0 away at Fratton Park in the League Cup.
26.10.08 – Chelsea lose 1–0 against Liverpool at Stamford Bridge in the Premier League. Chelsea's home unbeaten run ends after an astonishing 4 years, 8 months and 86 games.
12.11.08 – Chelsea lose 5–4 on penalties after a 1–1 draw in extra time against Burnley at home in the fourth round of the League Cup.
30.11.08 – Chelsea lose 2–1 against Arsenal at home in the Premier League after a Robin van Persie brace. Replays later show the Dutchman's first goal to be offside.
09.12.08 – Chelsea fight back to win 2–1 against CFR Cluj in the UEFA Champions League at home. With the win, they secure second place in Group A and advance to the First knockout round.
03.01.09 – Chelsea draw 1–1 against Football League One side Southend United in the third round of the FA Cup at Stamford Bridge.
11.01.09 – Chelsea lose 3–0 against Manchester United in the Premier League at Old Trafford, their first away loss in the Premier League this season.
17.01.09 – Chelsea snatch a crucial 2–1 home victory against Stoke City in the Premier League after two last minute goals from Juliano Belletti and Frank Lampard. Lampard also makes his 400th appearance for Chelsea.
01.02.09 – Chelsea lose 2–0 against Liverpool at Anfield in the Premier League by way of two late Fernando Torres goals after Frank Lampard is incorrectly sent off in the 60th minute.
09.02.09 – Due to the team's poor run of form, endangering Chelsea's hopes of Champions League qualification for the following season, the Chelsea board dismiss Luiz Felipe Scolari from his position as manager with immediate effect. Ray Wilkins is named as caretaker manager while a suitable replacement for Scolari is found.
11.02.09 – Russian national manager Guus Hiddink is named as temporary Chelsea manager until the end of the season.
14.02.09 – With Ray Wilkins in charge as caretaker manager, a Nicolas Anelka hat trick against Watford at Vicarage Road gives Chelsea a 3–1 victory and a place in the FA Cup quarter-finals against Coventry City. Michael Essien makes his return from the bench after six months out of action due to an ACL injury.
21.02.09 – In Guus Hiddink's first match as manager, a Nicolas Anelka goal and a gritty Chelsea performance bring about a vital 1–0 win against Aston Villa at Villa Park, Chelsea's first Premier League victory there since 1998–99. With it, Chelsea overtake Villa to reclaim third place in the table.
25.02.09 – Chelsea end the first leg of their Champions League first knockout round tie against Juventus with a slight advantage, winning the first ever competitive meeting between the clubs 1–0 by a Didier Drogba goal. The match also marks Petr Čech's 200th appearance for Chelsea.
28.02.09 – A John Terry volley and a late Frank Lampard header seal a 2–1 victory for Chelsea over Wigan Athletic in the Premier League. While Liverpool's 2–0 loss to Middlesbrough at the Riverside returns Chelsea to second place, Michael Mancienne makes his first ever Premier League start at right back, John Terry's goal makes him the highest scoring defender in Chelsea history, and Frank Lampard joins George Mills as Chelsea's joint sixth all-time scorer with 125 goals.
10.03.09 – A tempestuous 2–2 second leg draw at the Stadio Olimpico di Torino against Juventus, with goals scored by Michael Essien in his first start since September and a reborn Didier Drogba, gives Chelsea a 3–2 victory on aggregate in their Champions League first knockout round clash, sending them through to the quarter-finals of the competition.
08.04.09 – Chelsea claim a commanding 3–1 win in the first leg of their Champions League quarter-final tie with Liverpool at Anfield, recovering from an early Fernando Torres goal to score twice from the head of Branislav Ivanović, with a reborn Didier Drogba capping off the scoring. Liverpool captain Steven Gerrard is notably marked out of the game by Michael Essien.
11.04.09 – Chelsea take a 4–0 lead after 63 minutes against Bolton Wanderers at Stamford Bridge in the Premier League, scoring through Michael Ballack, a double from Didier Drogba and a penalty from Frank Lampard, for Bolton to surprisingly surge back into the game, scoring three goals in an eight-minute span. Although Bolton come close to equalising in injury-time, Chelsea just manage to hold off their comeback to scrape a 4–3 victory.
14.04.09 – The second leg of Chelsea's Champions League quarter-final match with Liverpool ends in a stunning 4–4 draw. After a clever Fábio Aurélio free-kick and a Xabi Alonso penalty give Liverpool a 0–2 lead in the first 30 minutes, Chelsea fight back in the second half to make the score 3–2 with goals from Didier Drogba and Frank Lampard sandwiching a trademark Alex cannonball free-kick. Two more goals from Lucas and Dirk Kuyt give Liverpool renewed hope in progression, but a second Lampard strike puts the tie to bed. The tie ends 7–5 to Chelsea on aggregate, leaving them to play a rampant Barcelona in the semi-finals, Chelsea's fifth attendance at this stage in six seasons. Ashley Cole's yellow card in this game rules him out of the first leg of that tie, leaving Chelsea without a recognised left back to field at the Camp Nou.
18.04.09 – A mistake by goalkeeper Łukasz Fabiański gifts Didier Drogba an 84th-minute winner in Chelsea's FA Cup semi-final clash against Arsenal at Wembley Stadium, sending Chelsea to a tense 2–1 victory after a goal by Florent Malouda equalises Theo Walcott's early strike. Chelsea consequently reach their ninth FA Cup final, to be contested against Everton on 30 May.
25.04.09 – Petr Čech's save from Mark Noble's penalty secures Chelsea a 1–0 Premier League victory over West Ham United at Upton Park after Salomon Kalou scores his ninth goal of the season before giving away a spot-kick at the other end. Michael Mancienne starts his second Premier League game of the season, while José Bosingwa makes an experimental appearance at left back in preparation for Chelsea's visit to the Camp Nou.
28.4.09 – A masterful defensive display by Chelsea sees them become the first team not to concede a goal at the Camp Nou this season in an intriguing 0–0 draw with Barcelona, the first leg of the clubs' Champions League semi-final tie. Petr Čech shrugs off his recent media criticism with a string of important saves and despite Barcelona's domination on possession, Didier Drogba has an excellent chance to secure an away goal for Chelsea, only to be stopped by a double save from Víctor Valdés at the end of the first half.
02.5.09 – John Terry's 400th game for Chelsea, a West London derby at Stamford Bridge against Fulham in the Premier League, ends in a 3–1 victory to the home side following goals from Gallic trio Nicolas Anelka, Florent Malouda, and Didier Drogba. The asymmetric 4–3–3 formation used by Chelsea in this game, with Anelka playing more like a second striker, was Guus Hiddink's preference for the remainder of the season.
06.5.09 – A controversial 1–1 draw in the second leg of Chelsea's Champions League semi-final tie against Barcelona at Stamford Bridge eliminates Chelsea from the competition on the away goals rule, sending Barcelona to the final to play Manchester United in Rome. Essien's brilliant left footed volley early in the game gives Chelsea the lead, but unclinical finishing and four viable penalty appeals turned down by Norwegian referee Tom Henning Øvrebø allow Barcelona to equalise in the ninety-third minute with their only shot on target all game, a strike from outside the penalty area by Andrés Iniesta, despite the earlier sending off of Eric Abidal. Incensed by the referee's terrible performance, Chelsea players surround and criticise Øvrebø after the final whistle, with Didier Drogba controversially labelling the result "a fucking disgrace" on live international television.
10.5.09 – Chelsea shake off their post-Barcelona blues with an emphatic 4–1 victory against Arsenal at the Emirates Stadium in the Premier League. After surviving an early bout of Arsenal pressure, Chelsea take a 3–0 lead through an Alex header, a long range shot from Nicolas Anelka against his former club, and a Kolo Touré own goal. Nicklas Bendtner pulls one back for the home side, but a tap in from Florent Malouda completes the rout. The result ends the Gunners' 21 game unbeaten run in the league, and is the joint best away result against Arsenal in the league in Chelsea's history. Chelsea will finish the league season in at least third place, securing automatic Champions League qualification for 2009–10.
17.05.09 – Chelsea's last home game of the season against Blackburn Rovers in the Premier League at Stamford Bridge ends in a 2–0 victory, with goals scored by Florent Malouda and Nicolas Anelka. The game is marked by an end-of-season party atmosphere as fans chant repeatedly for Guus Hiddink to remain at the club, criticising the club's apparent pursuit of Milan manager Carlo Ancelotti to replace Hiddink over the summer.
24.05.09 – The last game of Chelsea's 2008–09 season ends in a 3–2 victory against Sunderland away at the Stadium of Light. In preparation for the FA Cup final against Everton the following Sunday, Frank Lampard and Alex are rested, and Sunderland's still uncertain survival in the Premier League leads to a tense first half. Nicolas Anelka's long-range curler early in the second half, his 19th league goal of the season, secures him the Premier League Golden Boot ahead of Cristiano Ronaldo. Salomon Kalou replies to Kieran Richardson's equaliser, and, despite Kenwyne Jones' late header, Ashley Cole's first goal of the season wins the game for Chelsea.
30.05.09 – Chelsea win the 2009 FA Cup Final with a 2–1 victory over Merseysiders Everton, who were chasing their first FA Cup since their victory over Manchester United in 1995. A Louis Saha goal after 25 seconds becomes the fastest in FA Cup history, but Chelsea quickly recover with a Florent Malouda cross finding the head of Didier Drogba. Chelsea continue to dominate before finally taking the lead in the 70th minute, after Frank Lampard escapes his marker Phil Neville for the first time in the game and unleashes a shot from 25 yards. A Malouda shot from 40 yards is incorrectly judged not to have crossed the line after rebounding from the crossbar, but Chelsea hold on for a famous victory. Guus Hiddink ends his short tenure as Chelsea manager with silverware.

Squad

First-team squad

Reserve squad

 (On loan at Northampton Town)

 (On loan at Norwich City)

 (On loan at Watford)

 (On loan at Wycombe Wanderers)

 (On loan at Real Mallorca)

 (On loan at Oldham Athletic)

 (On loan at MK Dons)
 (On loan at De Graafschap)

  (On loan at Leyton Orient)

Youth squad

UEFA Champions League squad

 (from List B)

 (from List B)

 (from List B)
 (from List B)
 (from List B)

Club

Coaching staff

Start formations

Top scorers
Includes all competitive matches. The list is sorted by shirt number when total goals are equal.

Disciplinary record
Includes all competitive matches. Players with 1 card or more included only.

*  = 1 suspension withdrawn ** = 2 suspensions withdrawn

Overall
{|class="wikitable"
|-
|Games played || 59 (38 Premier League, 12 UEFA Champions League, 7 FA Cup and 2 League Cup)
|-
|Games won || 37 (25 Premier League, 5 UEFA Champions League, 6 FA Cup and 1 League Cup)
|-
|Games drawn ||  15 (8 Premier League, 6 UEFA Champions League and 1 FA Cup)
|-
|Games lost ||  7 (5 Premier League, 1 UEFA Champions League and 1 League Cup)
|-
|Goals scored || 110
|-
|Goals conceded || 44
|-
|Goal difference || +66
|-
|Yellow cards || 91
|-
|Red cards || 5 (2 withdrawn)
|-
|Worst discipline ||  John Terry (10 , 2 (1 withdrawn))
|-
|rowspan="2"|Best result || 5–0 (A) v Middlesbrough – Premier League – 2008.10.18
|-
|5–0 (H) v Sunderland – Premier League – 2008.11.01
|-
|Worst result || 0–3 (A) v Manchester United – Premier League – 2009.01.11
|-
|Most appearances ||  Frank Lampard (57 appearances)
|-
|Top scorer ||  Nicolas Anelka (25 goals)
|-
|Points || 126/177 (71.2%)
|-

Honours

Individuals

References

External links
Chelsea FC official website
Chelsea FC on Soccerbase

2008-09
2008–09 Premier League by team